Choreutis amethystodes is a moth in the family Choreutidae. It was described by Edward Meyrick in 1914. It is found in the Philippines, Taiwan and on the Ryukyu Islands and Java.

References

Choreutis
Moths described in 1914